The 2021–22 Israeli Premier League, also known as Ligat Tel Aviv Stock Exchange for sponsorship reasons, was the 23rd season since its introduction in 1999 and the 80th season of top-tier football in Israel.

Teams
A total of fourteen teams were competing in the league, including twelve sides from the 2020–21 season and two promoted teams from the 2020–21 Liga Leumit.

Hapoel Nof HaGalil and Hapoel Jerusalem were promoted from the 2020–21 Liga Leumit. Hapoel Nof HaGalil and Hapoel Jerusalem returned to the top flight after an absence of 15 and 21 years respectively.

Hapoel Kfar Saba and Bnei Yehuda were relegated to the 2021–22 Liga Leumit after finishing the 2020–21 Israeli Premier League in the bottom two places.

Members of the 2021–22 season

Stadiums and locations

Managerial changes

Foreign players
The number of foreign players were restricted to six per team, while only five could have been registered to a game.

In bold: Players that have been capped for their national team.

Regular season

Regular season table

Regular season results

Results by round

Championship round
Key numbers for pairing determination (number marks position after 26 games)

Championship round table

Results by round
The table lists the results of teams in each round.

Relegation round
Key numbers for pairing determination (number marks position after 26 games)

Relegation round table

Results by round

Season statistics

Top scorers

Source, as of 17 May 2022:

Hat-tricks

Notes

References

Israeli Premier League seasons
2021–22 in Israeli football leagues
Israel